"De Música Ligera" (Spanish for Of easy-listening music) is a song by the Argentine rock band Soda Stereo from their fifth studio album Canción Animal (1990). It is one of Soda Stereo's most famous and symbolic songs, whose musical influence has been remarkable in the history of Latin rock for over two decades. Due to its popularity, the song is considered an anthem of rock en español.

It was the last song performed on their farewell and semi-mythical concert "El Último Concierto" in 1997. At the end of that song, the band's lead singer and songwriter Gustavo Cerati thanked the fans of the band with a phrase that became famous: "Gracias... totales" (Spanish for: "Absolutely... Thank you"). This moment is remembered as one of the all-time most exciting in the history of Latin American rock.

Composition

Music 
The title and spirit of the song was taken from some albums Gustavo Cerati's parents had, which were named "Light Classics of all Times"

"The idea was to create instrumentation like that, very classical, of a band, and at the same time that had a light spirit.", Gustavo said.

Like the lyrics, the music is deceptive: simple and complex simultaneously. The whole song is built from the riff and supported by the sequence carried out by the guitar.  Four chords (Bm, G, D, A), emphasize the progression from G to D, where the power of the song is concentrated.  The complexity of the harmony stems from the fact that the drop from D to G occurs in the middle of each verse and not the beginning or end as the effect could suggest at first glance. And it is exactly this lack of coordination between the singing and harmony which gives rise to the irresistible attraction that has become one of the most successful songs in the history of Latin rock.

Cerati has said that "De Música Ligera is one of the most instant hits that I did with Soda Stereo."

Charly remembered that:

Lyrics 
The lyrics of "De música ligera" are surprisingly short, just seven lines. Their meaning is cryptic and intentionally ambiguous: a love of easy-listening, which Cerati recalls as something finished ("nada más queda" (nothing else remains)), but also as a permanent presence ("nada nos libra" (nothing frees us)).

In the first two verses, Cerati sings "ella durmió al calor de las masas, y yo desperté queriendo soñarla" (she slept to the heat of the masses, and I woke up wanting to dream about her). The expression is both beautiful and complex: it expresses a clash of states that are worlds apart (sleep and wakefulness), but also the desire to dream of that which has awakened him, to be reunited with her in his own dream. It also expresses her unconsciousness, lulled by the effect of the masses, faced with his lucidity, he cannot help waking up and seeing things as they really are.

Then he sings "algún tiempo atrás pensé en escribirle" (some time ago I thought about writing to her) but mysteriously informs us that he could not overcome "las trampas del amor" (the traps of love). The lyrics then conclude telling everyone that he will not send "cenizas de rosas" (ashes of roses), and "ni pienso evitar un roce secreto" (nor he will avoid a secret touch), confirming the duality that awakens "aquel amor de música ligera" (that easy-listening-music love).

Regarding the theme and the lyrics, Gustavo Cerati once said:

The names are in reference to the most used sequence of notes in all rock & pop, inherited from '20s jazz.
This sequence is utilized to teach bass, and has been widely played by hundreds of bands, in different octaves and variations.

Music video 
The accompanying music video to the song was directed by Alfredo Lois and shows the band performing the song. He adopted a colorful and intentionally amateur style with background of flowers and psychedelic colors.

Sales and certifications

Related circumstances 
 The song was the first release from the album Canción Animal (Animal Song) and made the group famous in Spain, thus completing its presence in the Latin world.
 In the farewell concert (1997), De música ligera was the last song. Gustavo Cerati announced it with the following words, «tengo una buena canción para cantar» (I have a good song to sing) and he closed with the now mythical expression, "Gracias...totales" (Thank you... totally).
 In Brazil, the song was covered by the Os Paralamas do Sucesso, with the title "De Música Ligeira" (version: Herbert Vianna) on their 1996 album Nove Luas, and by the group Capital Inicial, with the title À Sua Maneira (version: Dinho Ouro Preto) on their 2002 album Rosas e Vinho Tinto.
 The British rock band Coldplay covered the song during a concert on their A Head Full of Dreams Tour in La Plata, Argentina, on November 14, 2017, and it was released as a track on their live album Live in Buenos Aires on December 7, 2018. Five years later, the band covered the song again on the Buenos Aires shows of their Music of the Spheres World Tour.
During 2020, 3 Latin rock icons release the great song of Soda Stereo, Los Rabanes from Panama, Beto Cuevas (La Ley) from Chile and Randy Ebrigth (Molotov) from Mexico in ska version By Rockass Online Music Record Label.

References

External links
Official music video.
.

Soda Stereo songs
1990 singles
1990 songs
Songs written by Gustavo Cerati
Songs about music
Songs containing the I–V-vi-IV progression